Miya Folick (born June 10, 1989) is an American singer-songwriter based in Los Angeles, California.

Early life and education 
Folick was born in Santa Ana, California. She is half-Japanese and was raised as a Jōdo Shinshū Buddhist, learning to play the taiko drums in a church group.

Folick went to Foothill High School in Santa Ana, California, where she was on the basketball team and graduated in 2007. She has said she didn't enjoy playing basketball.

Folick attended New York University from 2007 to 2009 to study acting but transferred in 2009 and graduated from the University of Southern California in 2011 with a B.A. from the School of Theatre. During a gap semester, a high school friend taught her how to play guitar. She later started her band using Tinder, where she created a profile that said, "looking for a band."

Career
Folick released her debut EP, Strange Darling, in December 2015. The EP was followed with two singles, "Pet Body" (2) and "God Is a Woman" in 2016 prior to the release of her second EP Give It To Me, which was released in November 2017 by Terrible Records.

In September 2018, Folick released the new song "Stop Talking" and supporting music video. She released her debut album, Premonitions on October 26, 2018 to critical acclaim.

Folick joined the bands Pale Waves and Sunflower Bean on a United States and European tour in fall 2018.

In the fall of 2019, Folick toured with Bishop Briggs through the United States.

In 2022, Folick was featured in American Football's cover of Fade Into You.

Personal life 
Folick dated musician K.Flay (Kristine Meredith Flaherty) from 2018-2021. Folick is currently in a relationship with session drummer and producer, Sam KS.

Discography

Studio albums

Extended plays

Compilation albums

Singles

Guest appearances

References

External links 

 
 Miya Folick at Terrible Records

Living people
American women singer-songwriters
People from Santa Ana, California
American women musicians of Japanese descent
American people of Russian descent
American sopranos
American musicians of Japanese descent
American Buddhists
1989 births
American LGBT people of Asian descent
LGBT people from California
American LGBT singers
American LGBT songwriters
21st-century American women singers
21st-century American singers
Singer-songwriters from California